The blue-fronted parrotlet (Touit dilectissimus) is a species of bird in subfamily Arinae of the family Psittacidae, the African and New World parrots. It is found in Colombia, Ecuador, Panama, and Venezuela.

Taxonomy and systematics

The blue-fronted parrotlet is monotypic. However, some authors have treated it as conspecific with red-fronted parrotlet (T. costaricensis) under that English name. The two form a superspecies.

Description

Its body is mostly green, darker above than below. Its forehead ("front") is blue; it has a white eye ring and a red line in front of and below the eye with more blue below it. Its crown and hindneck are bronze-green. It has much red on the wing's "wrist", and its primaries are black with green outer edges. Its underwing coverts are yellow. Its central tail feathers are black and the others yellow with black tips. Males have more red on their wing than females; immatures resemble females with a less distinctive facial pattern.

Distribution and habitat

The blue-fronted parrotlet is found from eastern Panama south along the Pacific slope of Colombia and Ecuador as far as El Oro Province and in the Andes and Serranía del Perijá of Venezuela. It inhabits cloudforest and mature secondary forest.

Behavior

Movement

Blue-fronted parrotlets make seasonal movements from their core range to the lowlands and high elevations.

Feeding

Little is known about the blue-fronted parrotlet's diet. Stomach contents of specimens have included small fruits. It has been documented feeding on the fruits of family Clusiaceae.

Breeding

The blue-fronted parrotlet apparently breeds in May and June in Panama. Its season in Colombia includes March and June but is not well defined.

Vocalization

The blue-fronted parrotlet's most common calls are "a slightly nasal “chree” or bisyllabic “chu-ree”." Flocks in flight call together, "resulting in a continuous, noisy chattering." When perched it also makes "a soft churring “krr”."

Status

The IUCN has assessed the blue-fronted parrotlet as being of Least Concern. It has a large range but its population size is not known and is believed to be decreasing. No immediate threats have been identified. "Uncommon to rare...much habitat remains, little trade exists, and it is relatively secure."

References

Further reading
Juniper & Parr (1998) Parrots: A Guide to Parrots of the World; .

External links
World Parrot Trust Parrot Encyclopedia - Species Profile

Touit
Birds described in 1871
Taxa named by Philip Sclater
Taxa named by Osbert Salvin